is a Japanese animation studio, founded in 2007 by ex-Kyoto Animation director Yutaka Yamamoto and other staff. The company's name, “Ordet,” means “the word” in Danish, Swedish, and Norwegian. The company initially served as a subcontractor before producing their first fully solo work, an OVA episode of Black Rock Shooter, which aired in the spring of 2010. This was followed up with an 8-episode series that aired on noitamina from February 2, 2012, to March 22, 2012. In 2011, with studios Sanzigen and Trigger, Ordet joined the Ultra Super Pictures joint holding company.

Business
Ordet was founded in 2007 by Yutaka Yamamoto after being fired by his former employer Kyoto Animation during the production of Lucky Star. After Lucky Star completed its run, several members of the Kyoto Animation staff left the company and followed Yamamoto. Together, they founded Ordet with approximately ¥ 3 million of capital stock.

Staff

Former staff
Yutaka Yamamoto - Company representative director, founder, staff director
Shinobu Yoshioka - Staff director
Satoshi Kadowaki - Animation director, key animator
Emi Kesamaru - Art settings, background artist
Yoko Takada - Key animator

Works

TV series
Kannagi: Crazy Shrine Maidens (2008, production co-operation, animation production by A-1 Pictures)
Fractale (2011, production co-operation, animation production by A-1 Pictures)
Black Rock Shooter (2012, with Sanzigen)
Senyu (2013, with Liden Films)
Senyu 2 (2013, with Liden Films)
Wake Up, Girls! (2014, with Tatsunoko Production)

Films
Wake Up, Girls! - Seven Idols (2014, with Tatsunoko Production)
Wake Up, Girls! Seishun no Kage (2015, with Millepensee)
Wake Up, Girls! Beyond the Bottom (2015, with Millepensee)

OVAs
Kannagi: Crazy Shrine Maidens (2009, production co-operation, animation production by A-1 Pictures)
Black Rock Shooter (2010)
Miyakawa-ke no Kūfuku (2013, with Encourage Films)

ONAs
Blossom (2012)
Wake Up, Girl ZOO! (2014–2015, with Studio Moriken)

References

External links
  
 

 
Companies based in Osaka Prefecture
Japanese animation studios
Japanese companies established in 2007
Mass media companies established in 2007
Mass media in Osaka
Ultra Super Pictures